The Barberville Central High School (also known as the Pioneer Settlement for Creative Arts) is a historic school in Barberville, Florida, United States. It is located at 1776 Lightfoot Lane. On February 3, 1993, it was added to the U.S. National Register of Historic Places.

Pioneer Settlement for Creative Arts

Barberville Pioneer Settlement
The Pioneer Settlement for Creative Arts is an open air village is located on the grounds of the Barberville Central High School.  Since 1982 the museum has moved many historic structures to the grounds including:

 Pierson Railroad Depot (c. 1885)
 Astor Bridgekeeper's House (c. 1926)
 Turpentine Comm./Store (c. early 1900s)
 Turpentine Still (c. 1924)
 Pottery Shed (c. 1920s)
 Lewis Log Cabin (c. 1875)
 Midway United Methodist Church (c. 1890)
 Huntington Post Office (c. 1885)
 Quarters House (c. 1920s)
 Pastime touring boat (c. 1910) 
 The Joseph Underhill House (c.1879) The oldest known brick residence in Volusia County. Currently undergoing stabilization/restoration.	

Other structures have been built on site to demonstrate historical trades including a print shop, wheelwright shop and carriage house, a woodwright shop, and a blacksmith shop.

References

External links
 Volusia County listings at National Register of Historic Places
 Florida's Office of Cultural and Historical Programs
 Volusia County listings
 Pioneer Settlement for the Creative Arts
Pioneer Settlement for Creative Arts

National Register of Historic Places in Volusia County, Florida
High schools in Volusia County, Florida
Museums in Volusia County, Florida
Open-air museums in Florida
Native American museums in Florida
Public high schools in Florida
Vernacular architecture in Florida
School buildings completed in 1920
1920 establishments in Florida
Blacksmith shops